Systems biology is a biological study field that focuses on the systematic study of complex interactions in biological systems, thus using a new perspective (integration instead of reduction) to study them. Particularly from year 2000 onwards, the term is used widely in the biosciences.

The field has generated interest among scientists, resulting in regular and one-time conferences and meetings. Below is a partial list.

Systems biology

Lists of conferences